Edward Alexander Sivies (17 June 1902 – 14 July 1951) was an  Australian rules footballer who played with South Melbourne in the Victorian Football League (VFL).

Notes

External links 

1902 births
1951 deaths
Australian rules footballers from Victoria (Australia)
Australian Rules footballers: place kick exponents
Footscray Football Club (VFA) players
Sydney Swans players